Hannover 96 II is a German association football team from the city of Hannover, Lower Saxony. It is the reserve team of Hannover 96. The team's greatest success has been winning the now defunct German amateur football championship on three occasions, in 1959–60, 1963–64 and 1964–65.

The team also participated in the first round of the German Cup, the DFB-Pokal, on five occasions, in 1966–67, 1976–77, 1981–82, 1982–83 and 2004–05, without ever advancing further.

History
The team, playing as Hannover 96 Amateure, first appeared in the highest league of Lower Saxony, the tier two Amateuroberliga Niedersachsen West, after promotion in 1959. The team won the league in its first season there but was than moved to the eastern division which it won in 1963–64. The Amateurliga Niedersachsen became a unified league from 1964 onwards and Hannover 96 took out the first three league titles from 1964 to 1967.

Hannover 96 II became the first reserve team to reach the final of the German amateur championship when it defeated BV Osterfeld 3–0 in the replay of the 1959–60 final. It took out two more titles in 1963–64 and 1964–65, on both occasions defeating SV Wiesbaden in the final. After this two unsuccessful final appearances followed in 1965–66 and 1966–67, losing to SV Werder Bremen Amateure and STV Horst Emscher. The 1966 final was to be the only one contested by two reserve sides while the 1967 was the last for the team.

After the 1966–67 season the team declined somewhat, still a strong side in the Amateurliga but not winning another title. At the end of the 1973–74 season Hannover failed to qualify for the new Oberliga Nord, finishing fourth when a top-three finish was required. In 1984–85 the team was relegated from what had now become the Verbandsliga Niedersachsen, made an immediate return the following season but suffered another relegation in 1990. Hannover once more returned to the Verbandsliga and, in 1993–94, qualified for the new tier four Oberliga Niedersachsen/Bremen, finishing 14th, the lowest-possible spot to qualify. The team played in the Oberliga for three seasons as a lower table side until relegation in 1997.

Back in the western division of the Verbandsliga, once more divided, Hannover finished low in the table in 1998 and 1999 but won the league in 1999–2000 and returned to the Oberliga. Another relegationin 2001 was followed by promotion in 2003. A fifth place in the league in 2003–04 qualified the team for the re-formed Oberliga Nord where it played for the next four seasons. A league reform in 2008, when the 3. Liga was introduced, took Hannover up to the Regionalliga Nord, where it has been playing since.

Hannover 96 II also participated in the first round of the German Cup, the DFB-Pokal, on five occasions, in 1966–67, 1976–77, 1981–82, 1982–83 and 2004–05. On each occasion the team was knocked-out in the first round, by Borussia Neunkirchen, FC Bayern Munich, VfB Eppingen, Bayer 04 Leverkusen and Rot-Weiß Oberhausen.

Honours
The club's honours:
 German amateur championship
 Champions: 1959–60, 1963–64, 1964–65
 Runners-up: 1965–66, 1966–67
 Amateurliga Niedersachsen
 Champions: 1959–60, 1963–64, 1964–65, 1965–66, 1966–67
 Verbandsligas Niedersachsen-West
 Champions: 1999–2000, 2002–03
 Lower Saxony Cup
 Winners: 1981–82

Recent seasons 
The recent season-by-season performance of the club:

 With the introduction of the 3. Liga in 2008 as the new third tier, below the 2. Bundesliga, all leagues below dropped one tier.

Players

Current squad

References

External links 
Official club site 

Hannover 96
German reserve football teams
Lower Saxony reserve football teams